= City of Valla =

1981 role-playing game supplement

City of Valla is a 1981 role-playing game supplement published by John Scott Clegg.

== Contents ==
City of Valla is a supplement in which a two-map set depicts the city of Valla.

== Publication history ==
City of Valla was written and published by John Scott Clegg in 1981 as two large three-color maps.

== Reception ==
Jackie Selck reviewed City of Valla for Different Worlds magazine and stated that "Even without the guidebook, the city is a fascinating addition to my collection. It is worth far more than what the publisher is charging for it."
